Soltani Olya (also Romanized as Solţānī ‘Olyā; also known as Solţānī and Sutuni) is a village in Arabkhaneh Rural District, Shusef District, Nehbandan County, South Khorasan Province, Iran. At the 2006 census, its population was 137, in 44 families.

References 

Populated places in Nehbandan County